The Taft Independent is a free weekly feature community newspaper published in Kern County California. The Independent covers local news, features, letters, editorials, community voices and more. The newspaper office is located at 508 Center Street in Taft, California, 93268.

The Independent is published weekly on Friday. Weekly circulation is 3,500 issues distributed in Western Kern County and Eastern Santa Barbara County. The Independent's website receives 23,000 views per month.

Independent news stories are a source of news from Taft California on the Google, Yahoo and Dogpile news search engines.

The Independent is a member of the California Newspaper Publishers Association.

External links
 The Taft Independent
 

Weekly newspapers published in California
Publications established in 2006